Rue Chapel AME Church is a historic African Methodist Episcopal church located at 709 Oak Street in New Bern, Craven County, North Carolina.  It was built in 1941, and is a rectangular brick church building in the Late Gothic Revival style.  It features a gabled nave flanked by corner entrance towers. Also on the property is the contributing parsonage; a one-story, front-gable brick house of the American Craftsman style dated to the 1920s.

It was listed on the National Register of Historic Places in 1997.

References

African-American history of North Carolina
African Methodist Episcopal churches in North Carolina
Churches in New Bern, North Carolina
Churches on the National Register of Historic Places in North Carolina
Churches completed in 1941
20th-century African Methodist Episcopal church buildings
National Register of Historic Places in Craven County, North Carolina